Common-law relationships in Manitoba are government-sanctioned relationships available to both same-sex and different-sex unmarried couples in the Canadian province of Manitoba.  While not as extensive as the rights and benefits of marriage, these relationships provide some important benefits to unmarried couples.  Registration is voluntary; many of the laws apply automatically to any couple in the province after living together for several years.

Legislative history
In 2001, Manitoba enacted legislation extending the coverage of existing laws to same-sex couples, including changes to the following acts:

Family Maintenance Act (non-divorce support)
Dependants Relief Act (support from estates)
Civil Service Superannuation Act (civil servant pensions)
Legislative Assembly Act (pensions for MLAs—members of the Legislative Assembly)
Pension Benefits Act (provincially regulated pensions)
Teachers' Pension Act (teachers' pensions)
Fatal Accidents Act (death benefits)
Manitoba Public Insurance Corporation Act (death benefits)
Workers Compensation Act (death benefits)
Queen's Bench Act (the court that hears support applications)

In 2002, amendments were made to 56 Manitoba laws by the Charter Compliance Act (covering such things as adoption rights and conflict of interests requirements).

On June 30, 2004, the Common-Law Partners' Property and Related Amendments Act came into effect, changing the name of the Marital Property Act to the Family Property Act.  The new act extended this and many other property laws to all common-law partners, whether same-sex or different-sex, who have either registered their relationship with the Vital Statistics Agency or who have lived together for a specified period of time, usually three years.

Rights and benefits
According to Manitoba Justice, "Common-law partners who have registered their common-law relationship with the Vital Statistics Agency, or lived together and have a child together, or lived together for at least three years if there are no children of the relationship have all the same rights under the Family Maintenance Act as legally married spouses, including the right to seek spousal support." Federal Criminal Code law against polygamy prohibits family court recognition of any form of marriage being a "subsequent and simultaneous" conjugal union, whilst either common law partner remains married to a legal spouse.

While they are eligibly living together, each partner has significant rights and responsibilities in such areas as child custody, financial support and access to financial information about the partner, use of family assets, consent to sale or rental of the family home, and pension benefits under plans governed by Manitoba law (and in some cases, federal law).

According to the Vital Statistics Agency, "Once a relationship is registered, all the major property laws immediately apply to the couple in the same way they apply to married couples.  Registration is voluntary, and couples are not required to register. However, even if a couple does not register, the property laws will apply to them after they have lived together, usually for three years. In some cases, though, it is less than three years; couples with concerns about property or other rights should seek legal advice."

Furthermore, "if a common-law couple separates, each partner is entitled to half the value of the property acquired by the couple during the time they lived together, just like married couples. It also means that if one of the partners dies, the surviving common-law partner has a claim to his or her estate." Cohabitation as a "couple" does not grant either party recognition of family property rights or conjugal union status, whilst one or both cohabitants remain married to other(s). {s.293 Criminal Code of Canada}

Registration
Registration is done via filing a form with the Manitoba Vital Statistics Agency. Both parties must be 18 or older, living in a conjugal relationship in Manitoba, and not married or party to another common-law relationship.  Proof of identity is required, as well as proof of the death of a former spouse or common-law partner, or the dissolution of a previous marriage or common-law relationship. Cohabitants who are married to another become eligible to start the Manitoba passage of time only after obtaining a divorce from previous partner(s).

Termination
According to the Vital Statistics Agency, "A registered common-law relationship can be terminated only by registering a dissolution, and only once the couple has lived apart for at least one year. If the relationship was never registered, it can be terminated only by living apart for a length of time, in many cases three years.  The termination date affects some rights, such as the right to apply to court for a division of property. Either former partner has up to 60 days, after a dissolution is registered, to apply for an accounting and equalization of assets under the Family Property Act."

See also
 Same-sex marriage in Manitoba
 Same-sex marriage in Canada
 Marriage à la façon du pays
 Same-sex common-law marriage

References

Further reading
Family Law in Manitoba – 2005 Edition, Chapter 3, Manitoba Ministry of Justice
Changes to Property Laws affecting Common-Law Partners, Manitoba Ministry of Justice
 Registering or dissolving a common-law relationship, Manitoba Vital Statistics Agency

External links
Final Report of the Review Panel on Common-Law Relationships, 21 December 2001, Manitoba Ministry of Justice

Marriage, unions and partnerships in Canada
LGBT in Manitoba
LGBT law in Canada
Same-sex marriage in Canada by province or territory
Manitoba law
Family law in Canada
Manitoba